Eine große Liebe is a 1949 German film directed by Hans Bertram. It was entered into the 1949 Cannes Film Festival.

Cast
 Gisela Uhlen
 Michael Korrontay
 Barbara Bertram
 Rüdiger von Sperl
 Erika von Thellmann
 Udo Loeptin
 Hertha von Hagen
 Gustav Waldau
 Elisabeth Flickenschildt

References

External links

1949 films
West German films
1940s German-language films
German black-and-white films
Films directed by Hans Bertram
1940s German films